"Hey Baby (Drop It to the Floor)" is a song by American rapper Pitbull featuring T-Pain. It was released on September 14, 2010, as the lead single from Pitbull's sixth studio album Planet Pit. The song was written by Pitbull, T-Pain, and Sandy Vee; the latter is also the producer. The song samples a line from "Push It" by Salt-N-Pepa.

Critical reception
Amar Toor from Aol Radio Blog said that the song is "a pulsating rhythm and electrified beats, the track seems like it's tailor-made for South Beach's hottest dance floors. [...] Pitbull's reggaeton roots are evident throughout "Hey Baby", as a persistent, pulsating beat keeps the song grooving along, from start to finish. And as always, T-Pain puts his own indelible, Auto-Tuned stamp on the song, as he croons, "Hey Baby – you can be my girl I can be your man / And we can pump this jam however you want."

Chart performance
"Hey Baby (Drop It to the Floor)" debuted at number 51 on the US Billboard Hot 100 on the week of October 16, 2010. Four months later, the song reached it peak number seven on the chart, giving Pitbull his third top ten hit. This is T-Pain's eighth top ten as a featured artist, and thirteenth overall. As of May 2011, the single sold over two million digital copies in the US. On October 16, 2020, the single was certified triple platinum by the Recording Industry Association of America (RIAA) for combined sales and streaming equivalent units of over three million units in the United States.

Music video
According with an interview with Pitbull on MTV News, the music video was filmed in Miami and it was released onto Pitbull's official VEVO channel on November 6, 2010. It features Pitbull and T-Pain at a club, along with scenes of girls in leather catsuits. Two of the girls are Nayer and Sagia Castañeda.

The video has received over 270 million views.

The song is also featured in one of the trailers to the 2012 movie The Dictator.

Cover versions
In February 2011, Noy Alooshe used the music from "Hey Baby (Drop It to the Floor)" as the basis for Zenga Zenga, an auto-tuned song and viral YouTube video that parodies Libyan ruler Muammar Gaddafi.

Track listing
German CD single
"Hey Baby (Drop It to the Floor)" (Album Version) – 3:54
"Hey Baby (Drop It to the Floor)" (Radio Edit) – 3:24

Remixes
"Hey Baby (Drop It to the Floor)" (AJ Fire Remix) (remixed by Afrojack) - 4:23
"Hey Baby (Drop It to the Floor)" (Sidney Samson Remix) - 5:48
"Hey Baby (Drop It to the Floor)" (Alvaro Remix) - 5:33
"Hey Baby (Drop It to the Floor)" (Big Syphe Remix) - 5:31
"Hey Baby (Drop It to the Floor)" (Skrillex Dubstep Remix) - 4:13
"Hey Baby (Drop It to the Floor)" (MK Dub) - 5:44

Personnel
Songwriting – Armando C. Pérez, T-Pain, Sandy Vee
Production, instruments and mixing – Sandy Vee
Pitbull vocal recording – Al Burna
T-Pain vocal recording – Javier Valverde

Source:

Charts

Weekly charts

Year-end charts

All-time charts

Certifications

References

External links

2010 singles
Pitbull (rapper) songs
T-Pain songs
Songs written by Sandy Vee
Songs written by T-Pain
House music songs
Song recordings produced by Sandy Vee
2010 songs
Songs written by Pitbull (rapper)